Walter Belasco (December 1864 21 June 1939) was a Canadian silent film actor.

Selected filmography

References

External links
 
 

1864 births
1939 deaths
Canadian emigrants to the United States
Canadian male silent film actors
20th-century Canadian male actors